Flourishing is the fourth extended play by South Korean singer Chungha. It was released by MNH Entertainment and distributed by Stone Music Entertainment on June 24, 2019. "Snapping" was released as the title track on the same day. It is her first EP since the release of Blooming Blue in July 2018.

Background and release 
On June 12, 2019, it was reported that Chungha was returning with new music after five months since the release of her single "Gotta Go". It was revealed that Flourishing would be an extended play and be released on June 24 at 6 p.m. KST. A time table was also released revealing that from June 12 to June 21 teasers would be released, ending with a showcase on June 24 and the CD release a day later. The first teaser image showed a drastic change of image from the singer as she tries blonde hair for the first time and a more mature concept. A second teaser image was released two days later, reporting that this would be her third summer album after Hands On Me (2017) and Blooming Blue (2018). Two days later the third and final teaser image was released, showing the singer in a red aesthetic set. The EP marks the first time that Chungha released a song with hip hop elements, as she rapped for the first time on "Flourishing".

The EP was released on June 24, 2019, through several music portals including iTunes.

Track listing 
Digital download/CD

Charts

Release history

References 

2019 EPs
Chungha albums
Korean-language EPs